Pierre Georges Albert François Henry (9 December 1927 – 5 July 2017) was a French composer and pioneer of musique concrète.

Biography
Henry was born in Paris, France, and began experimenting at the age of 15 with sounds produced by various objects. He became fascinated with the integration of noise into music, now called noise music. He studied with Nadia Boulanger, Olivier Messiaen, and Félix Passerone at the Conservatoire de Paris from 1938 to 1948.

Between 1949 and 1958, Henry worked at the Club d'Essai studio at RTF, which had been founded by Pierre Schaeffer in 1943. During this period, he wrote the 1950 piece Symphonie pour un homme seul, in cooperation with Schaeffer. It is an important early example of musique concrète. Henry also composed the first musique concrète track to appear in a commercial film: the 1952 short film Astrologie ou le miroir de la vie by Jean Grémillon. Henry also scored numerous additional films and ballets.

Two years after leaving the RTF, he co-founded, with Jean Baronnet, the first private electronic music studio in France: Studio Apsone-Cabasse.

Among Henry's works is the 1967 ballet Messe pour le temps présent, a collaboration with composer Michel Colombier and choreographer Maurice Béjart that debuted in Avignon. In 1970 Henry collaborated with British rock band Spooky Tooth on the album Ceremony.

In 1997, a Métamorphose: Messe pour le temps présent compilation recording was released that brought together remixes of various compositions of Henry's by electronic artists Fatboy Slim, Coldcut, Saint Germain, The Mighty Bop and Dimitri From Paris. Composer Christopher Tyng was heavily inspired by Henry's Psyché Rock when writing the theme to the popular animated cartoon show Futurama. The theme is so reminiscent of Psyché Rock that it is considered a variation of the original which is a piece by Henry and Michel Colombier released in 1967. The track consists of bells, flutes, brass and rock ensemble (guitar, bass, drums) and electronic music. It is strongly inspired by The Troggs song "Wild Thing" (written by Chip Taylor) and "Louie Louie", written by Richard Berry and first popularized by The Kingsmen. 

Henry died on Wednesday 5 July 2017 at Saint Joseph's Hospital in Paris, at the age of 89.

Discography
 1950 Symphonie pour un homme seul (in collaboration with Pierre Schaeffer)
 1951 Le microphone bien temperé
Musique sans titre
Concerto des ambiguities mit Klavier
 1952 First film music with musique concrète for Jean Grémillons film Astrologie
 1953 Orphée 53, experimental opera for Donaueschingen Festival, first stage play with musique concrète (together with Pierre Schaeffer)
 1955 Arcane (ballet)
 1956 Haut voltage (ballet)
 1958 Coexistence
 1959 Investigations	
 1961 La Noire à Soixante
 1963 La Reine Verte (ballet)
 1967 Le Voyage (ballet)
 1967 Variations pour une porte et un soupir (Variations For a Door And a Sigh)
 1967 Messe pour le temps présent (in cooperation with Michel Colombier)
 1968 L’Apocalypse de Jean (Die Apokalypse des Johannes) with spoken text
 1968 Le Voyage (D'Après Le Livre Des Morts Tibétain)
 1969 Ceremony (with Spooky Tooth)
 1971 Nijinsky, clown de dieu (ballet)
 1973 Machine Danse
 1973 Kyldex I (cybernetic ballet)
 1975 Futuriste, in memory of the Italian Futurists Luigi Russolo
 1978 Dieu
 1979 La Dixième Symphonie, tribute to Ludwig van Beethoven
 1986 La Dixième Symphonie De Beethoven
 1990 Le livre des morts égyptien (Book of the Dead)
 1997 Interieur/Exterrieur
 2015 Choix d'oeuvres de 1950–1985 (Selections of works 1950–1985 on VOD Records Cat VOD133 Edition of 400 on 10xVinyl records)
 2021 Galaxie Pierre Henry

References

Footnotes

External links

Discography of vinyl records.
Pierre Henry at Virtual International Philharmonic
 http://media.hyperreal.org/zines/est/intervs/henry.html

1927 births
2017 deaths
Musicians from Paris
French electronic musicians
French experimental musicians
Electroacoustic music composers
French sound artists
French classical composers
French male classical composers
Musique concrète
Officers of the Ordre national du Mérite
20th-century French composers
20th-century classical composers
20th-century French male musicians
21st-century French composers
21st-century classical composers
21st-century French male musicians